The Trabzon Cup was a tournament for professional female tennis players played on outdoor hardcourts in Trabzon, Turkey. The event was classified as a $50,000 ITF Women's Circuit tournament which took place only in 2013. In the same year there were two Trabzon Cup events, the second came one week after the first.

Past finals

Singles

Doubles

External links 
 ITF search

 
ITF Women's World Tennis Tour
Hard court tennis tournaments
Tennis tournaments in Turkey
2013 establishments in Turkey
Sport in Trabzon